Ludwig Lavater (4 March 1527; Kyburg (castle) – 5 July 1586 in Zurich) was a Swiss Reformed theologian working in the circle of his father-in-law, Heinrich Bullinger. He served as Archdeacon at the Grossmünster in Zurich and briefly Antistes of the Zurich church as the successor of Rudolf Gwalther.

Lavater was a prolific author, composing homilies, commentaries, a survey of the liturgical practices of the Zurich church, a history of the Lord's Supper controversy, as well as biographies of Bullinger and Konrad Pellikan. His work on ghosts (De spectris ...) was one of the most frequently printed demonological works of the early modern period, going into at least nineteen early modern editions in German, Latin, French, English and Italian.

Works 
 De ritibus et institutis ecclesiae Tigurinae. 1559 (Modern edition: Die Gebräuche und Einrichtungen der Zürcher Kirche. Zürich: Theologischer Verlag, 1987. 
  Historia de origine et progressu controversiae Sacramentariae de Coena Domini, ab anno nativitatis Christi MDXXIIII. usque ad annum MDLXIII. Zurich: Christoph Froschauer, 1563. 
 De spectris, lemuribus et magnis atque insolitis fragoribus.. Leiden, 1569. 
 Von Gespänsten ..., kurtzer und einfaltiger bericht. Zürich, 1569 (VD 16 L 834). 
 Von Gespänsten, in Theatrum de Veneficis. Frankfurt, 1586.

References

External links

 
 
 
 Katrin Moeller, Lavater, Ludwig., in Lexikon zur Geschichte der Hexenverfolgung. ed. Gudrun Gersmann, Katrin Moeller and Jürgen-Michael Schmidt, in historicum.net
 Works of Ludwig Lavater in the Munich Digitization Center
 Works of Lavater at the Post-Reformation Digital Library

1527 births
1586 deaths
Demonologists
16th-century Swiss people
16th-century Calvinist and Reformed theologians
Swiss Calvinist and Reformed theologians
Academic staff of Carolinum, Zurich